"My Friend Stan" (stylised as "MY FRIEИD STAИ") is a song by the British rock band Slade, released in 1973 as the first single from the band's fourth studio album Old New Borrowed and Blue. It was written by lead vocalist Noddy Holder and bassist Jim Lea, and produced by Chas Chandler. It reached No. 2 in the UK, spending eight weeks on the chart. The single was certified UK Silver by BPI in October 1973.

Background
"My Friend Stan", alongside the compilation Sladest, was Slade's first release following drummer Don Powell's near fatal car crash in July 1973. The accident threw the band's future into doubt, however Powell survived and was soon able to join the band in recording material for their new album Old New Borrowed and Blue. One of the earliest songs to be recorded, "My Friend Stan" saw Powell still walking with the aid of a stick. He had to be lifted onto his drum stool during recording.

"My Friend Stan" was released in September 1973 and reached No. 2 in the UK. Prior to its release, Polydor had to import 100,000 copies of the single into the UK due to the high pre-order demand. After Lea had come up with the song's melody, the band's manager Chas Chandler persuaded him to complete it after he had heard Lea playing the melody on his home piano.

Release
"My Friend Stan" was released on 7" vinyl by Polydor Records in the UK, Ireland, across Europe, Australia, New Zealand, South Africa and Japan. The B-side, "My Town", would later appear as an album track on Old New Borrowed and Blue.

Promotion
A music video was filmed to promote the single, which was recorded at the Olympic Studios in Barnes. The video portrays the band recording the song, and features guitarist Dave Hill using his trademark Superyob guitar. In the UK, the band performed the song on the music show Top of the Pops. In France, they performed it on the TV show Dimanche Salvador. In America, the band performed the song on the TV show Midnight Special in 1974.

Critical reception
Upon release, Record Mirror said the song was a "much slower Slade offering" and "really rather subdued". They concluded that the song was an "obvious number one" and "in some ways more memorable than some of the earlier rampagers".

Track listing
7" Single
 "My Friend Stan" - 2:38
 "My Town" - 3:02

Chart performance

Cover versions
In 1973, Finnish singer Muska recorded a version of the song for her self-titled album. The song is titled "Ystävättäret".
In 1993, Belgian band The Romans recorded a version of the song for their album Major Panic.

Personnel
Slade
Noddy Holder - lead vocals, guitar
Dave Hill - lead guitar, backing vocals
Jim Lea - piano, bass, backing vocals
Don Powell - drums

Additional personnel
Chas Chandler - producer
 Engineer & Mix  Alan O'Duffy

References

1973 singles
1973 songs
Slade songs
Song recordings produced by Chas Chandler
Songs written by Noddy Holder
Songs written by Jim Lea
Irish Singles Chart number-one singles